La Guêpe (literally "The Wasp", but titled either Skybolt or Scalp in English, depending on the market) is a 1986 drama/thriller film directed by Gilles Carle.

Plot
A young pilot witnesses the unintentional murder of her two sons (by a rich, drunken couple driving carelessly) and, following a court's decision not to press criminal charges, she decides to get her revenge.

Cast
Chloé Sainte-Marie as Chloé Richard
Warren Peace as Steven Cook
Donald Pilon as Delphis Martin
Ethne Grimes as Stéphanie
Claude Gauthier as Louis Richard
Gilbert Turp as Marc
Paul Buissonneau as Joseph Lambert
Alain Villeneuve as Le ministre

References

External links
Canoe
 
 
 

1986 films
Films shot in Montreal
1986 thriller films
Canadian thriller films
French-language Canadian films
1980s Canadian films